Harold Leon Jackson (born January 6, 1946) is an American former professional football player who was a wide receiver in the National Football League (NFL) from 1968 through 1983. Jackson was drafted in the 12th round (323 overall) of the 1968 NFL Draft by the Los Angeles Rams. In 2014, Jackson was hired to serve as head coach at his alma mater Jackson State. He was fired five games into the 2015 season.

Professional career
After appearing in only two games during his rookie season, he was traded to the Philadelphia Eagles and quickly emerged as one of the top receivers in the NFL, finishing the 1969 season with 65 receptions for a league-best 1,116 yards and 9 touchdowns. During his years with the Eagles, Jackson led the NFL in receptions in 1972 and in receiving yardage in both 1969 and 1972.

Prior to the 1973 NFL season, the Eagles traded Jackson back to the Rams for quarterback Roman Gabriel (who was expendable as the Rams had acquired John Hadl). Jackson led the NFL in receiving touchdowns in 1973 with 13 and helped the Rams rebound from a 6–7–1 record the previous season to a 12–2 finish that won them the first of 7 straight NFC West Division Championships. Statistically, his greatest NFL game came against Dallas on October 14, 1973, when he caught 7 passes for 238 yards and 4 touchdowns (this came in the midst of a string of four games in which he caught a total of 13 passes for 422 yards for a 32.5-yard average with 8 touchdowns). During his career, Jackson was selected to play in the Pro Bowl five times. In 1972, he was named 2nd-team All-Pro by the Associated Press (AP), the Pro Football Writers Association (PFWA) and the Newspaper Enterprise Association (NEA) and was voted 1st-team All-NFC by the Associated Press (AP), The Sporting News and UPI. He was a consensus first-team All-Pro and All-NFC choice in 1973. He was voted 2nd team All-NFC by UPI in 1976, 1st team All-NFC by The Sporting News and UPI in 1977 and 2nd team All-Pro by the NEA in 1977.

In 1978, Jackson was traded to the New England Patriots. Alongside Stanley Morgan, Jackson helped form one of the NFL's best starting wide receiver duos of the late 1970s and early 1980s. Jackson became the NFL's active leader in receiving yards when Fred Biletnikoff retired after 1978, and remained the league leader for his remaining five seasons. At the time he was ranked 15th all-time, but would eventually reach second place. In 1979, Jackson finished with 1,013 yards receiving, 7 touchdown receptions and was second in the NFL in yards-per-catch with an average of 22.5.  His teammate Morgan, who was nine years younger than Jackson, was the only one to finish with a higher average that season. Jackson finished his career by playing one season each for the Minnesota Vikings (1982) and the Seattle Seahawks (1983).

During his career, Jackson had 29 career 100-yard games and three 1,000-yard seasons. At the time of his retirement, only Don Maynard had more career receiving yards than Jackson. He currently ranks 26th in league history in career receiving yardage.  For the decade of the 1970s, Jackson ranked first in receptions (432), yards (7,724) and receiving touchdowns (61).
Despite this, Jackson was not one of the wide receivers selected to the NFL's All-Decade Team for the 1970s and he has yet to be elected to the Pro Football Hall of Fame.

In 2011, the Professional Football Researchers Association named Jackson to the PRFA Hall of Very Good Class of 2011

NFL career statistics

Regular season

Coaching career
After retiring from professional football, Jackson coached receivers for 10 years in the NFL with New England (1985–89), Tampa Bay (1992–93) and New Orleans (1997–99). In his first NFL season as a coach, the Patriots won the AFC Championship and played in Super Bowl XX. In 1987, he suited for two of the Patriots replacement games, but did not play. Jackson served as the receivers coach at Baylor University.  On January 13, 2014, Jackson was named the head coach at Jackson State University. Coach Jackson was fired on October 6, 2015, after the Tigers got off to a 1–4 start.

Head coaching record

* Was fired on 10/06/15

College statistics
 1965: 45 catches for 612 yards
 1966: 56 catches for 878 yards with 11 touchdowns

References

1946 births
Living people
American football wide receivers
Baylor Bears football coaches
Benedict Tigers football coaches
Hartford Colonials coaches
Jackson State Tigers football coaches
Jackson State Tigers football players
Kentucky Wildcats football coaches
Los Angeles Rams players
Minnesota Vikings players
New England Patriots coaches
New England Patriots players
New Orleans Saints coaches
North Carolina Central Eagles football coaches
Philadelphia Eagles players
Players of American football from Mississippi
Sacramento Mountain Lions coaches
Seattle Seahawks players
Tampa Bay Buccaneers coaches
Virginia Union Panthers football coaches
Eastern Conference Pro Bowl players
National Conference Pro Bowl players
Sportspeople from Hattiesburg, Mississippi
African-American coaches of American football
African-American players of American football
20th-century African-American sportspeople
21st-century African-American sportspeople
10,000 receiving yards club